Shaqra University (SU) (Arabic: جامعة شقراء) is located in Sahqra, Saudi Arabia,  northwest of Riyadh). It comes under the supervision of the Ministry of Education. The university has twenty-four colleges in various disciplines. It is headquartered in Shaqra with its various colleges being geographically spread in the largest area of the Kingdom of Saudi Arabia covering several governorates and sub-governorates lying in the west of Riyadh.

History 

Shaqra University was established on the 3rd of Ramadan 1430 (Gregorian date 24 August 2009), as per the decision of King Abdullah bin Abdulaziz Al Saud, the Prime Minister and the Chairman of the Higher Education Council, Saudi Arabia.

University faculties 
The university currently has 24 colleges distributed in the governorates and sub-governoratesn, namely Shaqra, Huraymila, Al-Quwaiiyah, Al-Duwadimi, Sajir, Dhurma, Afif, Al-Muzahimiyah and Thadiq wa Mahmal.

Colleges at Shaqra University

Sports 
Participated in the Gulf championship for universities known as "The Eighth Sports Tournament for Universities and Institutions of Higher Education in the GCC Countries" in November 2017

Achieved a quantum leap in the performance indicator for universities since the university was ranked 21st last year, yet the university has been ranked 11th in the sports indicator for Saudi Universities among (31) universities and colleges.

Controversies 
In the past ten years, Shaqra University has received negative media coverage and backlash on social media in regards to its unfair recruitment conditions for university staff and low levels of satisfaction among students. The most recent controversy happened in 2018 during an "open meeting" between the rector, Awad Al-asmary and a group of medical students. In the meeting, a medical student expressed his concern about the absence of Saudi nationals from the teaching staff body. In response, the rector accused the student of racism against non-Saudi academics in the university. The video, which was circulated widely on social media, caused  a major backlash.

On several occasions, unqualified staff has been appointed because of their "connections" with high level officials. In 2015, Sabq, a Saudi news website, reported that an unqualified member of staff has been appointed based on the "recommendations" of a member of the Saudi Shura.

References

External links 
 Shaqra University Website
 Electronic services for students

2008 establishments in Saudi Arabia
Educational institutions established in 2008
Shaqra University